Gandyab-e Pain (also Romanized as Gandyāb-e Pā’īn) is a village in Natel Kenar-e Olya Rural District, in the Central District of Nur County, Mazandaran Province, Iran. At the 2006 census, its population was 745, in 181 families.

References 

Populated places in Nur County